The 2022 edition of the Canadian Polaris Music Prize was presented on September 19, 2022. The longlist was announced on June 14, with the shortlist following on July 14.

Shortlist

Longlist

Polaris Heritage Prize
Nominees for the Slaight Family Polaris Heritage Prize, an award to honour classic Canadian albums released before the creation of the Polaris Prize, were announced after the main Polaris Prize ceremony. The winners were announced on October 21.

References 

2022 in Canadian music
2022 music awards
2022
2022 awards in Canada